The Vladimir constituency (No.79) is a Russian legislative constituency in Vladimir Oblast. Until 2007 the constituency was based in western Vladimir Oblast and covered the entirety of Vladimir. However, in 2016 the constituency was drastically changed: now it is based in eastern part of the region and stretches from Vladimir to Gus-Khrustalny through Kovrov and Murom (which previously were a part of new eliminated Kovrov constituency).

Members elected

Election results

1993

|-
! colspan=2 style="background-color:#E9E9E9;text-align:left;vertical-align:top;" |Candidate
! style="background-color:#E9E9E9;text-align:left;vertical-align:top;" |Party
! style="background-color:#E9E9E9;text-align:right;" |Votes
! style="background-color:#E9E9E9;text-align:right;" |%
|-
|style="background-color:"|
|align=left|Gennady Churkin
|align=left|Agrarian Party
|
|18.69%
|-
|style="background-color:"|
|align=left|Leonid Shergin
|align=left|Yavlinsky–Boldyrev–Lukin
| -
|12.20%
|-
| colspan="5" style="background-color:#E9E9E9;"|
|- style="font-weight:bold"
| colspan="3" style="text-align:left;" | Total
| 
| 100%
|-
| colspan="5" style="background-color:#E9E9E9;"|
|- style="font-weight:bold"
| colspan="4" |Source:
|
|}

1995

|-
! colspan=2 style="background-color:#E9E9E9;text-align:left;vertical-align:top;" |Candidate
! style="background-color:#E9E9E9;text-align:left;vertical-align:top;" |Party
! style="background-color:#E9E9E9;text-align:right;" |Votes
! style="background-color:#E9E9E9;text-align:right;" |%
|-
|style="background-color:"|
|align=left|Gennady Churkin (incumbent)
|align=left|Agrarian Party
|
|18.41%
|-
|style="background-color:"|
|align=left|Pavel Voshchanov
|align=left|Independent
|
|13.14%
|-
|style="background-color:#F9E2E3"|
|align=left|Aleksandr Tikhonov
|align=left|Tikhonov-Tupolev-Tikhonov
|
|13.02%
|-
|style="background-color:#CE1100"|
|align=left|Yury Tsypkin
|align=left|My Fatherland
|
|9.43%
|-
|style="background-color:"|
|align=left|Leonid Shergin
|align=left|Yabloko
|
|7.20%
|-
|style="background-color:"|
|align=left|Vladimir Gvozdaryov
|align=left|Liberal Democratic Party
|
|3.93%
|-
|style="background-color:"|
|align=left|Nadezhda Sibirina
|align=left|Zemsky Sobor
|
|3.68%
|-
|style="background-color:"|
|align=left|Yury Leontyev
|align=left|Independent
|
|3.21%
|-
|style="background-color:"|
|align=left|Boris Belyakov
|align=left|League of Independent Scientists
|
|2.62%
|-
|style="background-color:#1A1A1A"|
|align=left|Andrey Yeremenko
|align=left|Stanislav Govorukhin Bloc
|
|2.53%
|-
|style="background-color:"|
|align=left|Emilia Burtseva
|align=left|Union of Patriots
|
|2.17%
|-
|style="background-color:"|
|align=left|Mikhail Borovkov
|align=left|Independent
|
|1.46%
|-
|style="background-color:#A8A821"|
|align=left|Vladimir Chertogorov
|align=left|Stable Russia
|
|1.26%
|-
|style="background-color:#FFF22E"|
|align=left|Vladimir Zabuga
|align=left|Beer Lovers Party
|
|1.15%
|-
|style="background-color:#000000"|
|colspan=2 |against all
|
|13.30%
|-
| colspan="5" style="background-color:#E9E9E9;"|
|- style="font-weight:bold"
| colspan="3" style="text-align:left;" | Total
| 
| 100%
|-
| colspan="5" style="background-color:#E9E9E9;"|
|- style="font-weight:bold"
| colspan="4" |Source:
|
|}

1999

|-
! colspan=2 style="background-color:#E9E9E9;text-align:left;vertical-align:top;" |Candidate
! style="background-color:#E9E9E9;text-align:left;vertical-align:top;" |Party
! style="background-color:#E9E9E9;text-align:right;" |Votes
! style="background-color:#E9E9E9;text-align:right;" |%
|-
|style="background-color:"|
|align=left|Gennady Churkin (incumbent)
|align=left|Independent
|
|16.56%
|-
|style="background-color:"|
|align=left|Igor Artyomov
|align=left|Independent
|
|14.94%
|-
|style="background:#1042A5"| 
|align=left|Sergey Kazakov
|align=left|Union of Right Forces
|
|14.69%
|-
|style="background-color:"|
|align=left|Tatyana Maksimova
|align=left|Independent
|
|11.89%
|-
|style="background-color:"|
|align=left|Aleksey Lyalin
|align=left|Unity
|
|5.78%
|-
|style="background-color:"|
|align=left|Anatoly Ravin
|align=left|Independent
|
|3.95%
|-
|style="background-color:"|
|align=left|Yevgeny Limonov
|align=left|Independent
|
|3.57%
|-
|style="background-color:"|
|align=left|Valentina Pavina
|align=left|Independent
|
|3.32%
|-
|style="background-color:#D50000"|
|align=left|Nikolay Fedorov
|align=left|Communists and Workers of Russia - for the Soviet Union
|
|3.14%
|-
|style="background-color:"|
|align=left|Gennady Volkov
|align=left|Independent
|
|3.05%
|-
|style="background-color:"|
|align=left|Vladimir Antropov
|align=left|Independent
|
|1.91%
|-
|style="background-color:#084284"|
|align=left|Aleksandr Ilyin
|align=left|Spiritual Heritage
|
|1.59%
|-
|style="background-color:"|
|align=left|Yury Khokhorin
|align=left|Independent
|
|1.03%
|-
|style="background-color:"|
|align=left|Nikolay Gastello
|align=left|Kedr
|
|0.52%
|-
|style="background-color:#000000"|
|colspan=2 |against all
|
|11.88%
|-
| colspan="5" style="background-color:#E9E9E9;"|
|- style="font-weight:bold"
| colspan="3" style="text-align:left;" | Total
| 
| 100%
|-
| colspan="5" style="background-color:#E9E9E9;"|
|- style="font-weight:bold"
| colspan="4" |Source:
|
|}

2003

|-
! colspan=2 style="background-color:#E9E9E9;text-align:left;vertical-align:top;" |Candidate
! style="background-color:#E9E9E9;text-align:left;vertical-align:top;" |Party
! style="background-color:#E9E9E9;text-align:right;" |Votes
! style="background-color:#E9E9E9;text-align:right;" |%
|-
|style="background-color:"|
|align=left|Igor Igoshin
|align=left|Communist Party
|
|21.26%
|-
|style="background-color:"|
|align=left|Igor Artyomov
|align=left|Independent
|
|17.94%
|-
|style="background-color:"|
|align=left|Gennady Churkin (incumbent)
|align=left|Agrarian Party
|
|10.33%
|-
|style="background-color:#7C73CC"|
|align=left|Nikolay Andrianov
|align=left|Great Russia – Eurasian Union
|
|8.77%
|-
|style="background:#1042A5"| 
|align=left|Sergey Kazakov
|align=left|Union of Right Forces
|
|7.51%
|-
|style="background-color:#00A1FF"|
|align=left|Galina Yesyakova
|align=left|Party of Russia's Rebirth-Russian Party of Life
|
|6.26%
|-
|style="background-color:#C21022"|
|align=left|Aleksandr Leontyev
|align=left|Russian Pensioners' Party-Party of Social Justice
|
|4.47%
|-
|style="background-color:"|
|align=left|Semyon Malakhovsky
|align=left|Liberal Democratic Party
|
|1.93%
|-
|style="background-color:"|
|align=left|Anton Belyakov
|align=left|Independent
|
|1.55%
|-
|style="background-color:"|
|align=left|Anatoly Ivashkevich
|align=left|Independent
|
|0.81%
|-
|style="background-color:"|
|align=left|Sergey Dulov
|align=left|Independent
|
|0.60%
|-
|style="background-color:"|
|align=left|Aleksandr Shikunov
|align=left|Independent
|
|0.36%
|-
|style="background-color:"|
|align=left|Anatoly Volkov
|align=left|Independent
|
|0.31%
|-
|style="background-color:#000000"|
|colspan=2 |against all
|
|15.94%
|-
| colspan="5" style="background-color:#E9E9E9;"|
|- style="font-weight:bold"
| colspan="3" style="text-align:left;" | Total
| 
| 100%
|-
| colspan="5" style="background-color:#E9E9E9;"|
|- style="font-weight:bold"
| colspan="4" |Source:
|
|}

2016

|-
! colspan=2 style="background-color:#E9E9E9;text-align:left;vertical-align:top;" |Candidate
! style="background-color:#E9E9E9;text-align:left;vertical-align:top;" |Party
! style="background-color:#E9E9E9;text-align:right;" |Votes
! style="background-color:#E9E9E9;text-align:right;" |%
|-
|style="background-color: " |
|align=left|Igor Igoshin
|align=left|United Russia
|
|53.08%
|-
|style="background-color:"|
|align=left|Larisa Yemelyanova
|align=left|Communist Party
|
|11.95%
|-
|style="background-color:"|
|align=left|Vladimir Sipyagin
|align=left|Liberal Democratic Party
|
|10.05%
|-
|style="background-color:"|
|align=left|Timur Markov
|align=left|A Just Russia
|
|7.00%
|-
|style="background-color:"|
|align=left|Sergey Kazakov
|align=left|Civic Platform
|
|4.16%
|-
|style="background:"| 
|align=left|Sergey Petukhov
|align=left|Communists of Russia
|
|2.98%
|-
|style="background:"| 
|align=left|Aleksey Yefremov
|align=left|Yabloko
|
|2.12%
|-
|style="background:"| 
|align=left|Aleksey Mayorov
|align=left|Party of Growth
|
|2.11%
|-
|style="background-color:"|
|align=left|Aleksey Avdokhin
|align=left|Rodina
|
|1.82%
|-
|style="background-color:"|
|align=left|Kirill Kovalev
|align=left|The Greens
|
|1.44%
|-
| colspan="5" style="background-color:#E9E9E9;"|
|- style="font-weight:bold"
| colspan="3" style="text-align:left;" | Total
| 
| 100%
|-
| colspan="5" style="background-color:#E9E9E9;"|
|- style="font-weight:bold"
| colspan="4" |Source:
|
|}

2021

|-
! colspan=2 style="background-color:#E9E9E9;text-align:left;vertical-align:top;" |Candidate
! style="background-color:#E9E9E9;text-align:left;vertical-align:top;" |Party
! style="background-color:#E9E9E9;text-align:right;" |Votes
! style="background-color:#E9E9E9;text-align:right;" |%
|-
|style="background-color: " |
|align=left|Igor Igoshin (incumbent)
|align=left|United Russia
|
|47.86%
|-
|style="background-color:"|
|align=left|Larisa Yemelyanova
|align=left|Communist Party
|
|24.23%
|-
|style="background-color:"|
|align=left|Sergey Kornishov
|align=left|Liberal Democratic Party
|
|6.01%
|-
|style="background-color: "|
|align=left|Aleksey Zakutin
|align=left|Party of Pensioners
|
|4.64%
|-
|style="background-color:"|
|align=left|Andrey Marinin
|align=left|A Just Russia — For Truth
|
|4.53%
|-
|style="background-color:"|
|align=left|Sergey Kazakov
|align=left|Russian Party of Freedom and Justice
|
|3.72%
|-
|style="background-color:"|
|align=left|Olga Smirnova
|align=left|Rodina
|
|2.37%
|-
|style="background:"| 
|align=left|Dmitry Kushpita
|align=left|Yabloko
|
|1.53%
|-
|style="background:"| 
|align=left|Nikolay Kvashennikov
|align=left|Party of Growth
|
|1.12%
|-
| colspan="5" style="background-color:#E9E9E9;"|
|- style="font-weight:bold"
| colspan="3" style="text-align:left;" | Total
| 
| 100%
|-
| colspan="5" style="background-color:#E9E9E9;"|
|- style="font-weight:bold"
| colspan="4" |Source:
|
|}

Notes

References

Russian legislative constituencies
Politics of Vladimir Oblast